Kawawachikamach (Naskapi: ᑲᐛᐛᒋᑲᒪᒡ) is a Naskapi village municipality in the territory of the Kativik Regional Government in northern Quebec; in fact, it is the only Naskapi village municipality, but nevertheless has a distinct legal status and classification from other kinds of village municipalities in Quebec: Cree village municipalities, northern villages (Inuit communities), and ordinary villages.

There is a counterpart Naskapi reserved land of the same name: Kawawachikamach, located some distance to the south.  Because the village municipality is north of the 55th parallel and the reserved land is south of it, they are actually in different administrative regions of Quebec: Nord-du-Québec (within Kativik) and Côte-Nord, respectively.

Despite the title of "village municipality" and the formalities that go along with it (for instance, having a mayor), this is actually an uninhabited area with no resident population: the Naskapi population all live on the reserved land, and the village municipality is for the exclusive use of Naskapis for hunting or other economic activities.

Demographics 

References

Incorporated places in Nord-du-Québec
Populated places established in 1981
1981 establishments in Quebec
Naskapi